Robert Logan Breitenstein (July 24, 1913 – March 28, 2002) was an American football player and coach.   He served as the head football coach at Appalachian State Teachers College—now known as Appalachian State University—for one season in 1959, compiling a record of 6–4.

Breitenstein was a native of Cincinnati, Ohio.  He attended Miami University in Oxford, Ohio, where he played college football as a halfback.  Breitenstein coached high school football at  Shaker Heights High School in Shaker Heights, Ohio.  He resigned as head football coach there in 1949 to take a job as backfield coach under Andy Gustafson at the University of Miami in Coral Gables, Florida. In Miami, he coached quarterback George Mira and fullback Don Bosseler. Breitenstein died in 2002.

Head coaching record

College

References

1913 births
2002 deaths
American football halfbacks
Appalachian State Mountaineers football coaches
Miami Hurricanes football coaches
Miami RedHawks football players
High school football coaches in Ohio
Players of American football from Cincinnati